LM22A-4 is a synthetic, selective small-molecule partial agonist of TrkB (EC50 for TrkB activation = 200–500 pM; IC50 for inhibition of BDNF binding to TrkB = 47 nM; IA = ~85%), the main receptor of brain-derived neurotrophic factor. It has been found to possess poor blood-brain-barrier penetration when administered systemically, so LM22A-4 has been given to animals instead via intranasal administration, with central nervous system TrkB activation observed. The compound produces neurogenic and neuroprotective effects in animals, and shows beneficial effects on respiration in animal models of Rett syndrome.

See also 
 Tropomyosin receptor kinase B § Agonists

References 

Carboxamides
Neuroprotective agents
Nootropics
Peripherally selective drugs
TrkB agonists